These are the Polish number one albums of 2000, per the OLiS Chart.

Chart history

References

Number-one albums
Poland
2000